The Oxalobacteraceae are a family of bacteria, included in the order Burkholderiales. Like all Pseudomonadota, Oxalobacteraceae are Gram-negative. The family includes strict aerobes, strict anaerobes, and nitrogen-fixing (diazotrophic) members. The cells are curved, vibroid, or straight rod-shaped.

References

Burkholderiales
Bacteria families